Vladimír Čech (6 July 1951 – 22 March 2013) was a Czech actor, presenter and former politician.

Čech was born and died in Prague.  He was the son of anchorwoman Heda Čechová (1928–2020) and actor Vladimír Čech, Sr. (1916–1990).

In 1977, Vladimír Čech graduated from the Theatre Faculty of the Academy of Performing Arts acting field and then played in Petr Bezruč Theatre in Ostrava, the Silesian Theatre in Opava, Ostrava State Theatre, the Český Těšín Theatre, Oldřich Stibor State Theatre in Olomouc (today Moravian Theatre) and in the East Bohemia Theatre in Pardubice. From 1990 to 1992 he worked as a member of the Czech National Council. Since 1999 he was a freelance actor, a member of File City theatres in Prague. He was also a host of the Czech version of Who Wants to Be a Millionaire? called Chcete být milionářem?, where he worked until September 2003. In 2008, Česká televize made a documentary series  with Vladimír Čech as the main character. On ČT he was the moderator of the program .

He was also known for his voice in dubbing, such as the title character in the cartoons and films about Garfield.

Between 2001 and 2003 he was elected the host of most popular competition in the television TýTý.

He died of Lynch syndrome and pneumonia in 2013, at the age of 61.

Czech dubbing
  (Walking with Monsters), 2005, dubbing 2008
 Van Helsing
  (The Truth About Killer Dinosaurs, part 1 and 2), 2005, dubbing 2008
  (Garfield and Friends)
  (Garfield: The Movie), 2004
 Garfield 2 (Garfield: A Tail of Two Kitties), 2006
  (Garfield Gets Real), 2007
 (Slumdog Millionaire) 2008

References

External links
Biography of Vladimír Čech on ČT website 
Biography of Vladimír Čech on worldonline.cz website 

1951 births
2013 deaths
Male actors from Prague
Czech male stage actors
Czech male voice actors
Deaths from colorectal cancer
Deaths from cancer in the Czech Republic
Deaths from pneumonia in the Czech Republic